2. Liga is the sixth tier of the Swiss football league system. The division is split into 17 groups of 12, 13 or 14 teams by geographical region. Teams usually play within their own canton.

Regional associations
 Aargauischer Fussballverband (AFV)
 Fussballverband Bern/Jura -  (FVBJ-AFBJ)
 Innerschweizerischer Fussballverband (IFV)
 Fussballverband Nordwestschweiz (FVNWS)
 Ostschweizer Fussballverband (OFV)
 Solothurner Kantonal-Fussballverband (SKFV)
 Fussballverband Region Zürich (FVRZ)
  (FTC)
  - Freiburger Fussballverband (AFF-FFV)
  (ACGF)
  (ANF)
  (AVF)
  (ACVF)

Current Season 
The 2022-23 season is the current season in the Swiss 2. Liga.

AFV (Aargau) 
 Baden 1897 II
 Brugg
 Fislisbach
 Frick
 Klingnau
 Lenzburg
 Menzo Reinach
 Oftringen
 Rothrist
 Sarmenstorf
 Schönenwerd-Niedergösgen
 Suhr
 Wettingen
 Wohlen II

FVBJ (Bern & Jura)

IFV (Luzern, Uri, & Zug) 
 Aegeri
 Altdorf
 Entlebuch
 Goldau
 Hochdorf
 Horw 
 Luzerner
 Littau
 Obergeissenstein
 Sarnen
 Schattdorf
 Sempach
 Sins
 Willisau

FVNWS (Aargau, Basel-Landschaft, Basel-Stadt, & Zürich) 
 Aesch
 Allschwil
 Amicitia Riehen
 Gelterkinden
 Laufen
 Möhlin-Riburg/ACLI
 Muttenz
 Oberwil
 Old Boys II 
 Reinach
 Rheinfelden 1909
 Sissach
 Timau Basel
 Wallbach-Zeiningen

External links 
 www.football.ch

6
Swiss